The Dr. Samuel Marshall Orr House, is an historic house located in Anderson, South Carolina.

Built in 1885, the two-story Greek Revival style house features a front façade of four columns that support a broad, plain entablature with low-sloped, boxed cornice pediment. The cornices of the hipped tin-covered roof, pediments, and shed roofs of side porches are adorned with modillions.

The main entrance consists of double doors surrounded by a three-light transom, four-light rectangular sidelights, and a pilaster molding that supports a paneled entablature. Directly above the main entrance a double casement window flanked by single casements opens onto a small balcony with a wooden balustrade.

Dr. Orr practiced medicine in Anderson for 25 years, and was active in the community. The house was listed in the National Register on April 13, 1973.

References

Houses on the National Register of Historic Places in South Carolina
Houses completed in 1885
Houses in Anderson County, South Carolina
National Register of Historic Places in Anderson County, South Carolina